Aleksander Rozmus (18 January 1901 – 18 April 1986) was a Polish ski jumper. He competed in the individual event at the 1928 Winter Olympics.

References

1901 births
1986 deaths
Polish male ski jumpers
Polish male Nordic combined skiers
Olympic ski jumpers of Poland
Olympic Nordic combined skiers of Poland
Ski jumpers at the 1928 Winter Olympics
Nordic combined skiers at the 1928 Winter Olympics
Sportspeople from Zakopane
20th-century Polish people